The Salvation Army Team Emergency Radio Network (SATERN) is a network of volunteer amateur radio operators that provide emergency communications between Salvation Army posts, and pass messages with health and welfare information between the Salvation Army and the general public.

The group is open to amateur radio operators of all license classes, and of any (or no) religious faith. SATERN routinely operates on VHF and HF ham bands, but may operate any mode on any amateur radio frequency during an event.

During the Northeast blackout of 2003 the group was active in Upstate New York as well as the Salvation Army headquarters in Manhattan.

When an F-5 Tornado hit Joplin, Missouri on May 5, 2011, the SATERN units were activated as well. They provided communications and helped with the distribution of water, ice, personnel items, food, and medical care. Food trucks were dispatched to many affected areas to provide meals to victims and emergency workers and law enforcement and assistance was given to victims that would show up. The distribution network also facilitated providing clothing and shelter for many people. The Salvation Army was providing the shelter and in-house eating facilities.

See also
Amateur Radio Emergency Service
Radio Amateur Civil Emergency Service

References

External links
 SATERN

Amateur radio emergency communications organizations
The Salvation Army